The 22435/22436 New Delhi - Varanasi Jn Vande Bharat Express is India's 1st semi-high speed, electric multiple unit train, connecting the states of New Delhi and Uttar Pradesh.

Overview 
This train is operated by Indian Railways, connecting New Delhi, Kanpur Central, Prayagaraj Jn, and Varanasi Jn. It is currently operated with train numbers 22436/22435 on 6 days a week basis.

Rakes 
It is the 1st Generation train of Vande Bharat Expresses and was designed and manufactured by the Integral Coach Factory (ICF) under the leadership of Sudhanshu Mani[3] at Perambur, Chennai under the Make in India initiative.

Coach Composition 
The 22435/22436 New Delhi - Varanasi Jn Vande Bharat Express currently has 14 AC Chair Car and 2 Executive Chair Cars coaches.

The coaches in Aqua color indicate AC Chair Cars and the coaches in Pink color indicate AC Executive Chair Cars.

Service 
The Maximum Permissible Speed (MPS) given is 130 km/hr.

Schedule 
The schedule of this 22436/22435 New Delhi - Varanasi Jn Vande Bharat Express is given below:-

Incidents 
A day after the launch of India's 3rd semi-high speed, the Vande Bharat Express from New Delhi to Varanasi Jn, this indigenous train had come to a halt after hitting a cow when returning from Varanasi towards New Delhi. This incident took place at Barhan, 15kms from Tundla in Uttar Pradesh. It was reported as case of skidding wheels after the train ran over a cattle. This incident took place just before the commercial run of the New Delhi - Varanasi - New Delhi Vande Bharat Express.

See also 
 Vande Bharat Express
 Tejas Express
 Gatimaan Express
 New Delhi railway station
 Varanasi Junction railway station

References 

Vande Bharat Express trains
Named passenger trains of India
Higher-speed rail
Express trains in India
 
Transport in Delhi
Rail transport in Delhi
Transport in Varanasi
Rail transport in Uttar Pradesh

